is a private junior college in Daitō, Osaka, Japan. The precursor of the school was founded in 1926, and it was chartered as a university in 1964. It is attached to Shijonawate Gakuen University. It is located in front of Shijōawate Station.

External links 
 Official website in Japanese

Private universities and colleges in Japan
Educational institutions established in 1926
Japanese junior colleges
Universities and colleges in Osaka Prefecture
1926 establishments in Japan
Daitō, Osaka